Antonio Islam Otegui Khalifi (born 7 March 1998) is a Spanish footballer who plays as a central midfielder for CD Badajoz.

Club career
Born in Mendavia, Navarre, Otegui was a CA Osasuna youth graduate. In the 2015 summer, he was called up straight to the main squad by manager Enrique Martín for the pre-season, and signed a new five-year deal with the club on 8 August of that year.

On 9 September 2015, without even appearing for the reserves, Otegui made his professional debut by coming on as a second-half substitute for fellow youth graduate José García in a 2–1 Copa del Rey away win against CD Mirandés. His Segunda División debut came on 17 October, again from the bench in a 1–0 home success over Albacete Balompié.

Otegui contributed with 11 appearances during the campaign, as his side achieved promotion to La Liga. He made his debut in the category on 17 October 2016, replacing Miguel de las Cuevas in a 3–2 away win against SD Eibar.

Otegui scored his first senior goal on 7 May 2017, netting the third for the B-side in a 3–0 home win against SD Ponferradina in the Segunda División B championship. On 10 August of the following year, he was loaned to UD Melilla in the third division for the season.

On 26 August 2019, Otegui joined CD Numancia in the second division, on loan for one year. 
Roughly one year later, he moved to third division side CD Badajoz. The next season, the move was permantely.

Career statistics

Club

References

External links

1998 births
Living people
People from Ribera del Alto Ebro
Spanish sportspeople of Moroccan descent
Spanish footballers
Footballers from Navarre
Association football midfielders
La Liga players
Segunda División players
Segunda División B players
Primera Federación players
Tercera División players
CA Osasuna B players
CA Osasuna players
UD Melilla footballers
CD Numancia players
CD Badajoz players
Spain youth international footballers